Dypsis ankirindro is a species of flowering plant in the family Arecaceae, known from Madagascar. It was named by William John Baker, Mijoro Rakotoarinivo, and Melinda S. Trudgen.

References

External links
 Dypsis ankirindro Species Information at www.trebrown.co.uk.

ankirindro